The 1983–84 Austrian Hockey League season was the 54th season of the Austrian Hockey League, the top level of ice hockey in Austria. Eight teams participated in the league, and VEU Feldkirch won the championship.

First round

Final round

Relegation
Wiener EV - Grazer SV 0:3 (4:7, 3:5, 5:10)

Wiener EV was relegated.

External links
Austrian Ice Hockey Association

Austria
Austrian Hockey League seasons
League